Team Jayco–AIS was an Australian road cycling team. The team was sponsored by the Australian division of recreational vehicle company Jayco and the Australian Institute of Sport. Jayco Australia's founder Gerry Ryan now funds Orica–GreenEDGE, a fellow Australian team that started in 2012, the same year Team Jayco–AIS folded. The team competed on the UCI Continental Tour mostly on the Oceania and Europe circuit. The team functioned as a launchpad for young Australian cyclists.

Team Jayco–AIS riders
 Jack Bobridge (2008–2009)
 Simon Clarke (2006–2008)
 Rohan Dennis (2009–2010, 2012)
 Luke Durbridge (2010–2011)
 Matthew Goss (2006)
 Michael Hepburn (2010–2011)
 Leigh Howard (2009)
 Damien Howson (2011–2012)
 Michael Matthews (2009–2010)
 Jay McCarthy (2011–2012)
 Travis Meyer (2008–2009)
 Glenn O'Shea (2009–2012)
 Wesley Sulzberger (2006–2008)
 Calvin Watson (2012)

Cycling teams based in Australia
UCI Continental Teams (Oceania)
Cycling teams established in 2006
Defunct cycling teams based in Australia
Cycling teams disestablished in 2012